The Mayor of the City of Saint John is the head of the elected municipal council of Saint John, New Brunswick, Canada. Saint John Common Council consists of a mayor (chair) and 10 councillors. The city has a ward system with four of  roughly equal population. This municipal arrangement was first adopted in the 2008 municipal election after a plebiscite held October 9, 2007. The mayor is directly elected along with two councillors that run at large. Since 2021, the deputy mayor has been chosen by Common Council after each election, having previously been the councillor at large who gained a plurality of votes. The current deputy mayor is John MacKenzie. Each ward elects two councillor.

Since the incorporation of Saint John in 1785, the mayor has served as the chief representative of the city. Officeholders were first appointed by the Governor of New Brunswick, under an order in council. By the end of the end of the nineteenth century, the mayor was elected by the alderman of Common Council. In 1854, the office was directly elected by Saint John residents. As head of the largest city in New Brunswick, many mayors have served as elected officials at the federal and provincial level both before and after their tenure.

Since 1785, 67 individuals have held the office of mayor. Notably, Samuel Davis, 1977-1980, served as the first elected Jewish Mayor of Saint John. In 1983 Elsie Wayne was elected the first woman mayor. She served until 1993. While serving only two years, Thomas J. Higgins was the first Catholic Mayor of Saint John. The former, Don Darling, was elected May 9, 2016. Donna Reardon, incumbent, was elected May 25, 2021.

List of Mayors

Appointed by Governor-In-Council

Gabriel G. Ludlow, 1785-1795
William Campbell, 1795-1816
John Robinson, 1816-1828 (Died In Office)
William Black, 1828-1829
Lauchlan Donaldson, 1829-1832
William Black, 1832-1833
John M. Wilmot, 1833-1834
Benjamin L. Peters, 1834-1835
William H. Street, 1835-1836
John Robertson, 1836-1837
Robert F. Hazen, 1837-1840
William Black, 1840-1843
Lauchlan Donaldson, 1843-1847
John R. Partelow, 1847-1848
William H. Street, 1848-1849
Robert D. Wilmot, 1849-1850
Henry Chubb, 1850-1851

Elected indirectly by Common Council

Thomas Harding, 1851-1852
William O. Smith, 1852-1853
James Olive, 1853-1854

Elected directly by residents

James Olive, 1854-1855
William O. Smith, 1855-1859
Thomas Mcavity, 1859-1863
Isaac Woodward, 1863-1866
Aaron Alward, 1866-1870
Thomas M. Reed, 1870-1874
A. Chipman Smith, 1874-1877
Sylvester Z. Earle, 1877-1879
Charles R. Ray, 1879-1881
Simeon Jones, 1881-1884
J. Mcgregor Grant, 1884-1885
J.S. Boies Deveber, 1885-1887
Henry J. Thorne, 1887-1889
George A. Barker, 1889  (Died In Office)
I. Allen Jack, July 7-August 9, 1889 (As Recorder Under City Charter)
W. Albert Lockhart, 1889-1891
Thomas W. Peters, 1891-1894
George Robertson, 1894-1898
Edward Sears, 1898-1900
John Waterhouse Daniel, 1900-1902
Walter W. White, 1902-1906
Edward Sears, 1906-1908
Thomas H. Bullock, 1908-1910
James H. Frink, 1910-1916
Robert T. Hayes, 1916-1920
E. Allen Schofield, 1920-1922
Harry R. Mclellan, 1922
G. Frederick Fisher, 1922-1924
Frank L. Potts, 1924-1926 (Died In Office)
Walter W. White, 1926-1932
James W. Brittain, 1932-1936
D. Laurence Maclaren, 1936-1940
Charles R. Wasson, 1940-1944
James D. McKenna, 1944-1948
Ernest W. Patterson, 1948-1950
George E. Howard, 1950-1952
Ernest W. Patterson, 1952-1954
Gilbert B. Peat, 1954-1956
William W. Macaulay, 1956-1958
D. Laurence Maclaren, 1958-1960 (Died In Office)
James A. Whitebone, 1960
Eric L. Teed, 1960-1964
Stephen H. Weyman, 1964-1966
Arthur L. Gould, 1966
Arthur L. Gould, January–June 1967
Joseph A. Macdougall, 1967-1969
H. Avard Loomer, 1969 (Died In Office)
James E. Calvin, 1969-1971
Bob Lockhart, 1971-1974
Edis A. Flewwelling, 1974-1977
Samuel Davis, 1977-1980
Bob Lockhart, 1980-1983
Elsie Wayne, 1983-1993
Thomas J. Higgins, 1994-1995
Shirley McAlary, 1995-2004
Norman McFarlane, 2004-2008
Ivan Court, 2008-2012
Mel Norton, 2012-2016
Don Darling, 2016-2021
Donna Reardon, 2021-Present

References

Saint John, New Brunswick